Bruno Malias Mendes better known as Bruno (born 23 March 1980) is a Brazilian beach soccer player. He plays in forward position.

Honours

Beach soccer
 Brazil
FIFA Beach Soccer World Cup winner: 2006, 2007, 2008, 2009
FIFA Beach Soccer World Cup qualification (CONMEBOL) winner : 2005, 2006, 2008, 2009, 2011
Mundialito winner: 2003, 2005, 2006, 2007, 2011
Copa Latina winner: 2005, 2006, 2009

Individual
FIFA Beach Soccer World Cup Top Scorer Bronze Ball (MVP): 2006
FIFA Beach Soccer World Cup Top Scorer Bronze Shoe (Top Scorer): 2006, 2007

References

External links

Stats at FIFA

1980 births
Living people
Brazilian beach soccer players
Footballers from Rio de Janeiro (city)
Brazilian footballers